Alessandro Bausani (Rome, May 29, 1921 – Rome, March 12, 1988) was a scholar of Islam, Arab and Persian studies, interlinguistics and the History of Religion, translating many works into Italian. He was one of the greatest Italian scholars of Islam, as well as a translator and commentator of one of the most important translations of the Qur'an into the Italian language.

A great polyglot, he spoke more than 30 languages, including Esperanto, African and Native American languages such as Cherokee and several important languages in the islamic world such as Indonesian, Arabic, Persian and Turkish.

Academic career 
From 1956 to 1971 Bausani taught Persian language and literature and Indonesian language as well as Indonesian literature at the'Istituto Universitario Orientale in Naples. There he instituted teaching of Urdu language and Urdu literature' and Persian literature of India'. Later he taught Islamic studies at the Scuola Orientale of the Facoltà di Lettere e Filosofia of the Università di Roma "La Sapienza".

Both universities, and the Venezia were leading centres of Oriental studies, and his work drew great interest from students, created a school which is still today highly activity in studying the field of mystical-religious experience in the Islamic world , as well as study of Sunni and Shi'ite Islam. His work included the translation into Italian of the poetry of Muhammad Iqbal (Parma, 1956), as well as that of Nizami, Omar Khayyam and Rumi.

He also taught the History of Religion and was responsible for history and philosophy of the Middle East and Far East at the Istituto Universitario Orientale di Napoli and the Socio nazionale dell'Accademia dei Lincei.

He served as the President of the Istituto per l'Oriente in Rome.

Influence 
Alessandro Bausani's influence was recognised by diverse communities. His significance as an Italian scholar was noted in his inclusion in the Treccani Enciclopedia Italiana. His significance as a scholar of Iranian culture is reflected by the entry on his work in the Encyclopædia Iranica. The value of his work in the field of Indonesian studies was noted in an obituary published in the journal Indonesia Circle. An obituary published in the Baháʼí Studies Review demonstrates the recognition his work gained in the religious community to which he belonged.

Publications 
A bibliography of his work up until 1 May 1981 is found in La bisaccia dello sheikh. Omaggio ad Alessandro Bausani islamista nel sessantesimo compleanno, Venezia, Quaderni del Seminario di Iranistica, Uralo-Altaistica e Caucasologia dell'Università degli studi di Venezia, 1981.

Here is a selection of his principal works:

Main translations of religious texts 

 Il Corano, introduzione, traduzione e commento, Firenze, Sansoni, 1955 (Translation of the Qur'an into Italian)
 Testi religiosi zoroastriani, Catania, Ed. Paoline, 1962 (Zoroastrian Religious Texts)
 La bbona notizzia. Vangelo di Matteo nella versione romanesca di Alessandro Bausani, Recco (Ge), Gruppo Editoriale Insieme, 1992 (The Good News, the Gospel of Matthew: a Romanesco Dialect version by Alessandro Bausani)

Translations from Persian 

 Omar Khayyam, Quartine (Roba'iyyat), Torino, Einaudi, 1956 (Rubaiyat of Omar Khayyam)
 Avicenna, Opera poetica, Roma, Carucci, 1956 (Poetic Works)
 Rumi, Poesie mistiche, Milano, Rizzoli-BUR, 1980 (Mystic Poetry)
 Nezami, Le sette principesse, Milano, Rizzoli-BUR, 1982 (The Seven Princesses)
 Muhammad Iqbal, Il poema celeste, Bari, Leonardo da Vinci, 1965 (The Heavenly Poem)

Monographs 

 "Sguardo alle letterature del Pakistan", in Oriente Moderno, XXXVII (1957), pp. 400–424 (An examination of the literature of Pakistan)
 Storia delle letterature del Pakistan. Urdu, Pangiâbî, Sindhî, Beluci, Pasc'tô, Bengali, Pakistana, Milano, 1958 (History of the Literature of Pakistan)
 Persia Religiosa, da Zaratustra a Bahá'u'lláh, 1959 (Persian Religion from Zoroaster to Bahá'u'lláh)
 Storia della Letteratura persiana, 1960 (The History of Persian Literature)
 I Persiani, Firenze, Sansoni, 1962 (The Persians)
 L'Islam non arabo, in Storia delle religioni, fondata da P. Tacchi Venturi (ed. interamente rifatta e ampliata), Torino, 1970-1 ("Non-Arab Islam" in "The History of Religions")
 Le lingue inventate, Roma, 1974 (trad. tedesca abbreviata e anticipata Geheim- und Universalsprachen: Entwicklung und Typologie, Stoccarda, 1973) (Constructed Languages)
 Buddha, Chiasso, 1973
 L'Enciclopedia dei Fratelli della Purità, Napoli, Istituto Universitario Orientale, 1978.  (Encyclopedia of the Brethren of Purity)
 L'Islam, Milano, Garzanti, 1980
 Una rosa d'Oriente: Tahirih, Cosenza, Tipografia Gnisci, 1980 (A Rose of the East)
 La fede Baháʼí e l'unità del genere umano. (The Baháʼí Faith and the Oneness of Humanity)
 Saggi sulla fede Baháʼí, Roma, Casa Editrice Baháʼí, 1991 (Studies on the Baháʼí Faith)

Other 
 Can Monotheism Be Taught? (Further Considerations on the Typology of Monotheism). Numen, Vol. 10, Fasc. 3 (Dec., 1963), pp. 167–201. Brill.

Bibliography 
 
 “In memoria di Alessandro Bausani nel decennale della morte (1988–1998)”, su: Oriente Moderno, n.s. LXXVIII (1998), 3, pp. da 421 a 529.

References 

Islamic studies scholars
Translators of the Quran into Italian
Italian Arabists
Writers from Rome
1921 births
1988 deaths
20th-century Italian male writers
Italian historians of religion
Italian scholars of Pakistan studies
Academic staff of the Sapienza University of Rome
Italian Bahá'ís
20th-century Bahá'ís
20th-century translators
Iranologists